"Better" is a song recorded by American singer-songwriter Meghan Trainor featuring American rapper Yo Gotti released as the third and final single from Trainor's second major-label studio album Thank You (2016). Trainor, Gotti, Taylor Parks, Travis Sayles, Eric Frederic, Tommy Brown and Steven Franks wrote the song, and the latter three produced it. Initially released as a promotional single, the track was released on August 29, 2016, as the third single from the album. It was well received by critics who considered it a different direction for Trainor.

"Better" peaked at number 35 on the US Adult Top 40 and at number 27 on the US Mainstream Top 40. Released on September 15, 2016, the music video was directed by Tim Mattia and featured a cameo from Beau Bridges. Critics praised it for telling an important story and being more raw than Trainor's previous releases. Trainor performed the song on The Tonight Show Starring Jimmy Fallon, and included it on the setlist for The Untouchable Tour (2016).

Background and composition

Following a disagreement with label director L.A. Reid, Meghan Trainor created the single "No" with producer Ricky Reed. Ultimately, the song changed the direction of its parent album, as they started experimenting with new musical styles and produced six more tracks. Trainor, Mario Mims, Taylor Parks, Travis Sayles, Eric Frederic, Tommy Brown and Steven Franks wrote "Better", and the latter three produced it. The song was digitally released as the third promotional single from Trainor's second major-label studio album, Thank You (2016), on April 21, 2016. It was serviced to adult contemporary radio as the third single from the album on August 29, 2016, and to top 40 radio and rhythmic radio on August 30. On September 13, 2016, she unveiled the single artwork on her social media accounts.

"Better" is a dancehall, reggae, and pop song with R&B influences. The pop ballad features "funky drums" accompanied by guitar strings which gives it an "Island-esque" vibe. The track has steel percussion, syncopated guitar, and a loping beat which gives it a caribbean feel. It features Trainor criticizing her ex-boyfriend, with lyrics about how she deserves better, over a tropical beat. On his rap verse, Gotti talks about treating Trainor the way that she deserves. Colin Stutz of Billboard called it an "empowering breakup anthem". According to Christina Lee of Idolator, the song is more vulnerable than Trainor's previous efforts.

Reception
"Better" was well received from critics. Writing for Andpop, Rebecca Matina opined that "Better" is a step in a different direction from Trainor's previous works and wrote "we’re loving the throwback-Rihanna vibes that we’re getting". Alexa Camp of Slant Magazine praised the track, writing that Trainor was down-to-earth and "it feels like we’re catching a glimpse of the real Meghan". Isabella Biedenharn of Entertainment Weekly called the song "woozy" and "ethereal", but added that it sounds like "a castoff from Selena Gomez’s Revival.

"Better" peaked at number 35 on the US Adult Top 40 and at number 27 on the US Mainstream Top 40.

Music video

Background and concept

On September 13, 2016, Trainor posted the first teaser of the music video for "Better" on her Instagram, followed by the second teaser on the next day. On September 15, 2016, Trainor released the video, directed by Tim Mattia. It featured a cameo from Beau Bridges with themes revolving around drug addiction and alcohol abuse. Trainor got a temporary tattoo of scissors for her role in the video.

Synopsis
The video begins with Trainor bailing her grandfather (Beau Bridges) out of a county jail. Trainor gives  him a ride from the prison to a barbershop. He apologizes in the car while asking Trainor to pick up his pills from the store and Trainor admits she had already bought them to him, which he denies. The song begins as Trainor and Bridges enter the barbershop where she works as a hairdresser. As the video progresses, Trainor serves customers while her grandfather deals with his substance abuse. He has a fight in a bar and faints. A bartender (Yo Gotti) calls Trainor to inform her of this. Trainor brings him back to the house where she has fights with her grandfather. Following scenes show Gotti consoling Trainor. The video ends with Bridges being arrested again and Trainor breaking down in tears. Alternatively, the video could have been a flashback with latter events leading up to the arrest at the beginning.

Reception
The music video received critical acclaim. Fuse'''s Bianca Gracie praised Trainor for "get[ting] a little more raw and tell[ing] an important story that doesn't come off as too try-hard" and described the video as a "dramatic" short film. Also believing that the video "contains a serious message", Lauren Daley of The Boston Globe noted that it is reminiscent of MTV's "'80s and '90s video heyday". Allison Sadlier of Entertainment Weekly thought the video saw Trainor take an emotional journey and took the song to "new emotional heights" and  Sophie Schillaci of Entertainment Tonight wrote that Trainor "turn[s] up the drama". Describing the video as a new style for Trainor, Muchs Allison Bowsher said that she "is doing a 180, showing off her acting chops and shining light on substance abuse". Digital Spys Joe Anderton gave the video a more mixed review, writing that the concept "is great, especially considering it's a song we assumed to be about a boyfriend on first listen - but it doesn't really go far enough to make a proper impact".

Live performances
Trainor performed the song on The Tonight Show Starring Jimmy Fallon''. The song was part of Trainor's setlist for The Untouchable Tour (2016).

Charts

Release history

References

2010s ballads
2016 singles
2016 songs
American reggae songs
Dancehall songs
Epic Records singles
Meghan Trainor songs
Pop ballads
Song recordings produced by Tommy Brown (record producer)
Songs written by Meghan Trainor
Songs written by Ricky Reed
Songs written by Tayla Parx
Songs written by Tommy Brown (record producer)
Songs written by Yo Gotti
Sony Music singles
Yo Gotti songs